Boody Hill is a summit located in Central New York Region of New York located in the Town of Steuben in Oneida County, northwest of Steuben.

References

Mountains of Oneida County, New York
Mountains of New York (state)